Edwin Field (16 December 1871 – 9 January 1947) was an English rugby union forward who played club rugby for Cambridge University, Clifton R.F.C., Richmond, Barbarians and Middlesex Wanderers and international rugby for England. He also played cricket for Cambridge University and Middlesex.

Personal history
Field was born in Hampstead in 1872 to Walter Field, a landscape painter. He was educated at Clifton College from 1882 to 1891, before matriculating to Trinity College, Cambridge in 1891. He received his B.A. in 1894. He worked as a solicitor, and died on 9 January 1947 at Bromley Cottage Hospital.

Rugby career
In 1891, Field was the captain of the Clifton College rugby team. He played in the Varsity Match in 1892, 1893 and 1894. In 1893, Field played both his international matches for England as part of the Home Nations Championship. The first was the first match between Wales and England in Cardiff. The second match was against Ireland at Lansdowne Road. By the time he played for England, Field had already joined Middlesex Wanderers. Between April 1893 and February 1894, he played three matches for the Barbarians, scoring a dropped goal.

After Middlesex Wanderers folded, Field joined Richmond alongside Charles Hooper, who had also been playing for them.

Cricket career
Field played for Trinity College, Cambridge, and for Cambridge University, taking part in the Varsity Match in 1894. He played for Berkshire County Cricket Club in 1895, which was the year the club was formed. Between 1904 and 1906, he played six matches for Middlesex, all of them at Lord's Cricket Ground.

References

1871 births
1947 deaths
Alumni of Trinity College, Cambridge
Barbarian F.C. players
Berkshire cricketers
Cambridge University cricketers
Cambridge University R.U.F.C. players
Cricketers from Greater London
England international rugby union players
English cricketers
English rugby union players
Middlesex cricketers
People educated at Clifton College
Rugby union fullbacks
Rugby union players from Hampstead